Hildegard Bleyler (November 12, 1899 – February 6, 1984) was a German politician of the Christian Democratic Union (CDU) and former member of the German Bundestag.

Life 
From 1945 onwards, she participated in the building of the CDU. She became chairwoman of the regional women's advisory council of the Baden CDU and member of the regional executive committee. She was a member of the German Bundestag from 1953 to 1965.

Literature

References

1899 births
1984 deaths
Members of the Bundestag for Baden-Württemberg
Members of the Bundestag 1961–1965
Members of the Bundestag 1957–1961
Members of the Bundestag 1953–1957
Female members of the Bundestag
20th-century German women politicians
Members of the Bundestag for the Christian Democratic Union of Germany
Commanders Crosses of the Order of Merit of the Federal Republic of Germany